Cyanaeorchis is a genus of flowering plants from the orchid family, Orchidaceae. It contains three known species, all of which are endemic to South America.

Cyanaeorchis arundinae (Rchb.f.) Barb.Rodr. - Brazil, Argentina, Paraguay
Cyanaeorchis minor Schltr. - Brazil
Cyanaeorchis praetermissa J.A.N.Bat. & Bianch. - Brazil

See also
 List of Orchidaceae genera

References

 Berg Pana, H. 2005. Handbuch der Orchideen-Namen. Dictionary of Orchid Names. Dizionario dei nomi delle orchidee. Ulmer, Stuttgart

External links

Catasetinae genera
Orchids of South America
Catasetinae